Dolabrifera dolabrifera is a species of sea hare, a marine gastropod mollusc in the family Aplysiidae, the sea hares.

Distribution
This species occurs worldwide in tropical and subtropical seas and oceans.

Description
The maximum recorded length is 108 mm.

Habitat 
The minimum recorded depth for this species is 0 m; the maximum recorded depth is 3 m.

Life cycle

References

 Keen M. (1971). Sea shells of Tropical West America. Marine mollusks from Baja California to Perú. (2nd edit.). Stanford University Press pp. 1064:
 Bebbington A. (1977) Aplysiid species from Eastern Australia with notes on the Pacific Ocean Aplysiomorpha (Gastropoda, Opisthobranchia). Transactions of the Zoological Society of London 34: 87-147.
 Rolán E., 2005. Malacological Fauna From The Cape Verde Archipelago. Part 1, Polyplacophora and Gastropoda.
 Rosenberg, G., F. Moretzsohn, and E. F. García. 2009. Gastropoda (Mollusca) of the Gulf of Mexico, Pp. 579–699 in Felder, D.L. and D.K. Camp (eds.), Gulf of Mexico–Origins, Waters, and Biota. Biodiversity. Texas A&M Press, College Station, Texas.

Further reading 
 Powell A. W. B., New Zealand Mollusca, William Collins Publishers Ltd, Auckland, New Zealand 1979 

Aplysiidae
Gastropods described in 1828